Paul Morris Fitts Jr. (May 6, 1912 – May 2, 1965) was a psychologist at the Ohio State University, where he conducted research in conjunction with personnel at Wright-Patterson Air Force Base, generally recognized as the "birthplace of human factors engineering."  FItts also later taught at the University of Michigan. He developed a model of human movement, Fitts's law, based on rapid, aimed movement, which went on to become one of the most highly successful and well studied mathematical models of human motion.

Early Life and Career

During his time as s lieutenant colonel in the US Air Force, Fitts had improved aviation safety by focusing on human factors in what were called "man-machine operations" in that era. He thus became widely recognized as a pioneer in the emerging multi disciplinary science of human factors engineering.There are also indications Fitts worked in some capacity as a consultant concerning the interview of alleged UFO witnesses, and was planning work on how terrestrial or psychological explanations could account for UFO sightings.

In 1965 he died unexpectedly at the age of 52.He was President of Division 21 (Division of Applied Experimental and Engineering psychology) of the American Psychological Association (APA), in 1957–1958. The association now has a Paul Fitts honorary award. Fitts was also elected a Fellow in the Human Factors and Ergonomics Society  and served as president the organization in 1962-63 (when it was simply named the Human Factors Society).

Education 

He received degrees in psychology at the following universities:
 University of Tennessee (BS 1934)
 Brown University (MS 1936)
 University of Rochester (PhD 1938)

References

External
 Cliff Kuang, "How the Dumb Design of a WWII Plane Led to the Macintosh", Wired.  November 13, 2019.

1912 births
1965 deaths
20th-century American psychologists
Aviation inventors
Human–computer interaction
United States Air Force officers
University of Michigan faculty
Ohio State University faculty
People from Martin, Tennessee
Brown University alumni
University of Rochester alumni